The 1982 Munster Senior Hurling Championship final was a hurling match played at Semple Stadium on 18 July 1982 to determine the winners of the 1982 Munster Senior Hurling Championship, the 95th season of the Munster Senior Club Hurling Championship, a tournament organised by the Munster Council of the Gaelic Athletic Association. The final was contested by Cork and Waterford, with Cork winning by 5-31 to 3-6.

The Munster final between Cork and Waterford was the 9th Munster final meeting between the two teams. Cork were hoping for their 39th Munster title and their first win since 1979. Waterford were hoping for their 6th Munster title and their first win since 1963.

References

1981 in hurling
Munster Senior Hurling Championship Finals
Cork county hurling team matches
Waterford county hurling team matches